Everybody's Baby: The Rescue of Jessica McClure (1989) is a dramatic television film for ABC, based on the true story of the rescue of 18-month-old Jessica McClure from a well. It featured, as extras, many participants in the actual rescue and its coverage.

Plot
Based on the true story of Jessica McClure, the child who fell into an abandoned water well while playing in her aunt's backyard in Midland, Texas. She was stuck in the well 22 feet down and it took rescuers 58 hours to get her out. There was fear that if they shook the ground too much with machinery they could cause her to fall further down and die.  Rescuers managed to successfully excavate alongside the well shaft and bring her to safety.

Cast
 Beau Bridges – Police Chief Richard Czech
 Pat Hingle – Fire Chief James Roberts
 Roxana Zal – Cissy McClure
 Will Oldham – Chip McClure
 Whip Hubley – Robert O'Donnell
 Robin Gammell – MSHA Investigator Thomas Kaye
 Walter Olkewicz – Police Officer Andy Glasscock
 Rudy Ramos – Police Officer Manny Beltran
 Jack Rader – Public Information Officer James White
 Guy Stockwell – Bill Jones
 Daryl Anderson – Richard Armstrong
 Mills Watson – Charles Boler
 Patty Duke – Carolyn Henry
 Laura and Jennifer Loesch – Jessica McClure

Production

Although it is supposed to be set in Midland, Texas, the entire filming took place in a suburban backyard of Los Angeles, California.

External links
 
 Baby Jessica Rescue Web Page
 Everybody's Baby, movie trailer

1989 films
1989 crime drama films
American television films
Drama films based on actual events
Films scored by Mark Snow
Films directed by Mel Damski
Films set in 1987
Films set in Texas
Films shot in Los Angeles
ABC Motion Pictures films
1980s English-language films